Andrea Catsimatidis (born ) has been the chair of the Manhattan Republican Party since 2017. A New York native and socialite, she is the daughter of John Catsimatidis.

Early life and education 
Catsimatidis is the daughter of John Catsimatidis and his second wife, Margo Vondersaar, whom he married in October 1988. She has a younger brother; John Catsimatidis Jr. She studied business at New York University, where she chaired the College Republicans. She graduated with a BS in Business Management and double minors in Political Science and Communications.

Career 
Catsimatidis is an executive of the Red Apple Group and is a principal of Red Apple Real Estate, Vice President of First Federal Guarantee Insurance Company, and managing director of Gristedes supermarkets. All three companies are owned by her father.

Politics 
She was elected chair of the Manhattan Republican party in 2017, a position she has held since. In January 2019, she appeared on CNN to discuss the government shutdown. In March 2019, the New York Post'''s Jon Levine called her a "rising GOP star". After Joe Biden defeated then-President Donald Trump in the 2020 presidential election, Catsimatidis made unsubstantiated claims of election fraud. In November 2020, she said "Is Joe Biden planning a coup by trying to create his own parallel government?" In February 2021 Catsimatidis tweeted "Corporate America helped rig the election.” Shortly after a mob of Trump supporters stormed the Capitol, Catsimatidis promoted debunked claims that Antifa activists were among the rioters; she emphasized that her aim was to ensure all the evidence was considered, so attackers could be brought to justice.

 Personal life 
In 2011, Catsimatidis married Christopher Nixon Cox, Richard Nixon's grandson, at the Greek Orthodox Archdiocesan Cathedral of the Holy Trinity, "before a church packed with family members and political powerhouses," including Hillary Clinton, Henry Kissinger, Rudolph Giuliani, Charles Schumer, Ray Kelly, and Robert M. Morgenthau.Super wedding snubs McCain (May 23, 2011), New York Post. An elaborate black-tie wedding reception for 700 guests was held at the Waldorf-Astoria. Her father said that he spent "in excess of $1 million" on the wedding.

Senator John McCain of Arizona was not invited, although Cox had worked on his 2008 presidential campaign, because McCain did not endorse Cox when Cox later ran (unsuccessfully) for Congress. Catsimatidis told the New York Post'' that "I thought that was low. I was just disgusted."

She and Cox divorced in 2014.

References 

New York (state) Republicans
New York University alumni
American women in business
American people of Greek descent
Living people
Year of birth missing (living people)
21st-century American women